Manifestation of conscience is a practice, in religious orders, of making one's superior, such as an abbot or prior, aware of the state of one's conscience.  This is so the superior may know them intimately, and thus further their spiritual progress.

Overview
Manifestation of conscience is not a form of Confession and therefore the superior need not be a priest.  As in Confession, however, the secret must, however, be kept inviolably, and hence a subject may object to any external use whatever of the revelations he has made to the superior.

The knowledge of the state of soul acquired by manifestation of conscience enables the superior to determine the expediency of the frequency of communion, what spiritual reading is to be selected, what penances to be practised, what counsel to be given concerning doubts, difficulties, and temptations.

By the decree "Quemadmodum", of 17 December 1890, Pope Leo XIII forbade both mandatory manifestation of conscience and the practice of superiors inducing their subjects to make such manifestations.

External links

Religious (Catholicism)
Catholic canon law of religious
Catholic liturgy